Cameron Lawrence may refer to:

 Cameron Lawrence (American football) (born 1991), American football linebacker
 Cameron Lawrence (racing driver) (born 1992), American racing driver